Kaiyuan Temple (traditional Chinese: 開元寺, simplified Chinese: 开元寺, pinyin: kāi yuán sì) could be several Buddhist temples：

 Kaiyuan Temple (Quanzhou), in Quanzhou, Fujian, China

 Kaiyuan Temple (Chaozhou), in Chaozhou, Guangdong, China

 Kaiyuan Temple (Taiwan), in Tainan, Taiwan

 A former name of the Shanhua Temple in Datong, Shanxi Province, China
 A former name of the Yuanmiao Temple in Huizhou, Guangdong, China

See also
 Meiyuan Kaiyuan Temple Station, Wuxi, Jiangsu, China

Buddhist temple disambiguation pages